The commune of Nyanza-Lac is a commune of Makamba Province in southern Burundi. The capital lies at Nyanza-Lac.

References

Communes of Burundi
Makamba Province